This is a list of episodes of the South Korean variety-cooking show Please Take Care of My Refrigerator. The show aired on JTBC every Monday at 21:30 (KST) from November 17, 2014 to November 25, 2019.

Chefs' Statistic
Horizontally: Win – Lose
Vertically: Lose – Win
X = no match

Season 1 (2014–2016)

Notes

Season 2 (2017)

Notes

Season 3 (2018)

Notes

Season 4 (2019)

Season 1~4 unity

List of Episodes

2014

2015

2016

2017

Remarks

2018

2019

Notes

References

Lists of South Korean television series episodes